Michael Haydn's Symphony No. 32 in D major, Perger 23, Sherman 32, MH 420, was written in Salzburg in 1786.

Scored for flute, 2 oboes, 2 bassoons, 2 horns, 2 trumpets, timpani and strings. It is Haydn's only symphony in two movements; this it has in common with Carl Nielsen's Symphony No. 5 but not much else (Delarte, 2006).

Vivace assai
Rondeau

At measure 20, a new theme is introduced forte with a more pronounced dance character. After the establishment of A major, the second subject group begins at measure 41:

leading to a much more lyrical theme at measure 55. After a typical unison scale run, the exposition concludes with A major firmly established as the tonic. The development is concerned almost exclusively with Example 2. A general pause precedes the recapitulation, which besides reorienting the second subject group to D major, also mixes the subjects of the groups together, with special emphasis on Example 2. Haydn indicated the development, recapitulation and coda are to be repeated as a unit, but that repeat is normally ignored in modern performance.

For the slow movement, the second oboist switches to flute.

The concluding Rondo's principal theme 

is triadic to an extent not encountered in the previous movement, while the contrasting themes tend to be stepwise.

Discography

On the CPO label, this symphony is available on a CD that also includes Symphonies Nos. 21, 30 and 31; Johannes Goritzki conducting the Deutsche Kammerakademie Neuss. The exposition repeat in the first movement is obeyed, the repeat of the development and recapitulation is ignored.

References

 Charles H. Sherman and T. Donley Thomas, Johann Michael Haydn (1737 - 1806), a chronological thematic catalogue of his works. Stuyvesant, New York: Pendragon Press (1993)
 C. Sherman, "Johann Michael Haydn" in The Symphony: Salzburg, Part 2 London: Garland Publishing (1982): lxviii

External links
 The Classical Archives has the entire work in two MIDI format files at the H page. Continuo is omitted. Both repeats in the first movement are obeyed. The tempi for both movements are almost the same as in the Goritzki recording.

Symphony 32
1786 compositions
Compositions in D major

fr:Symphonie nº 30 de Michael Haydn